TSOB may refer to:
The Sexuality of Bereavement, an EP by death/doom metal band My Dying Bride.
The Spoils of Babylon, a TV series
Tourist Standard Open Buffet, a type of British railway carriage